Awangbow Newmai is an Indian politician and the President of Naga People's Front State Unit in Manipur. He was elected to the Manipur Legislative Assembly from Tamei in 2007 as an Independent Candidate and as Naga People's Front Candidate in 2017, and 2022 Manipur Legislative Assembly election. In 2022 March 21 he was sworn in N. Biren Singh Second ministry as Minister for Water Resources and Relief & Disaster Management. He was former Minister of Environment, Forest and Climate Change (2020-2022) in N. Biren Singh first ministry.

References

Living people
Manipur MLAs 2022–2027
Manipur MLAs 2017–2022
Naga People's Front politicians
1968 births
People from Tamenglong district
North-Eastern Hill University alumni